Dayne Weston (born 15 December 1988) is an Australian former professional rugby league footballer. He played for the Cronulla-Sutherland Sharks, North Queensland Cowboys, Penrith Panthers and Melbourne Storm in the National Rugby League and Leigh Centurions in the Super League. Weston made his début for the Panthers in the 33–10 victory over Brisbane Broncos.

Background
Weston was born in Goulburn, New South Wales, Australia.

He played his junior rugby league for hometown club Goulburn Stockmen.

Playing career
Weston made his first grade debut for Cronulla-Sutherland against the Wests Tigers in round 5 of the 2007 NRL season at Campbelltown Stadium.  In the 2008 NRL season, Weston joined North Queensland and made 19 appearances for the club as they finished second last on the table.  North Queensland only avoided finishing last due to Canterbury's inferior for and against.  The following year, Weston only played twice for North Queensland as they finished 12th on the table.

In 2011, Weston joined Penrith and played two seasons at the club.  In 2012, he played 21 games as Penrith finished second last above bottom placed Parramatta.  In 2014, Weston joined Melbourne.

On 12 July 2015, it was announced that Weston had agreed a 2-year deal with leading Kingstone Press Championship club Leigh Centurions, covering the 2016 and 2017 seasons.

In June 2017, Weston announced he would be retiring at the end of the season, but his retirement was brought forward due to requiring ankle surgery. he played his final game for the club on 22 June 2017 against Widnes Vikings.

References

External links
Leigh Centurions profile
Burleigh Bears profile
Weston @ Cowboys.com.au
Weston @ rleague.com

1986 births
Living people
Australian rugby league players
Cronulla-Sutherland Sharks players
Leigh Leopards players
Melbourne Storm players
North Queensland Cowboys players
Penrith Panthers players
Rugby league players from Goulburn, New South Wales
Rugby league props
Rugby league second-rows
Sheffield Eagles players